The BVG Class HK is a type of electric multiple unit in service on the Berlin U-Bahn. It is operated by Berliner Verkehrsbetriebe (BVG) (Berlin Transport Company). 

The HK is a Kleinprofil (small profile) variant of the larger Großprofil (large profile) H series. The main difference is that while a H-series set has walkway connections between all its carriages, the HK 4-car series only has two connections between the first and second, and third and fourth cars - each set can be divided into two 2-car trains.

Production history

Operational history
The HK series primarily operates on the U2 line.

References

Berlin U-Bahn
Electric multiple units of Germany
750 V DC multiple units
Bombardier Transportation multiple units